Adam Robert Ottavino (born November 22, 1985) is an American professional baseball pitcher for the New York Mets of Major League Baseball (MLB). He has previously played in MLB for the St. Louis Cardinals, Colorado Rockies, New York Yankees, and Boston Red Sox.

Amateur career
A native of New York City, Ottavino was born in Manhattan and moved to Brooklyn when he was three years old. He attended elementary school at P.S. 39, The Henry Bristow School in the Park Slope neighborhood of Brooklyn, junior high school at I.S. 240 Andries Hudde and graduated from the Berkeley Carroll School in Park Slope in 2003. He attended one of the aforementioned schools with future teammate Dellin Betances, who was a couple of grades younger. They were also in the same baseball league as kids, and Ottavino described him as very tall and lanky, saying he matured into his well-built  structure as he got older. The Tampa Bay Devil Rays selected Ottavino in the 30th round of the 2003 MLB draft, but he did not sign.

Ottavino enrolled at Northeastern University, where he played college baseball for the Northeastern Huskies baseball team. Ottavino holds both the Northeastern career and single season records for strikeouts. In 2005, he was named America East Conference's Pitcher of the Year. After the 2005 season, he played collegiate summer baseball with the Harwich Mariners of the Cape Cod Baseball League.

Professional career

St. Louis Cardinals
The St. Louis Cardinals selected Ottavino out of Northeastern University in the first round, with the 30th overall selection, of the 2006 MLB draft. That year, he pitched for the Swing of the Quad Cities of the Class A Midwest League. He pitched for the Springfield Cardinals of the Class AA Texas League in 2008. In 2009, Ottavino pitched for the Memphis Redbirds of the Class AAA Pacific Coast League (PCL). He had an 0–9 win–loss record in the first half of the season, but had a 7–3 record in the second half.

After the 2009 season, the Cardinals added Ottavino to their 40-man roster. He began the 2010 season with Memphis. On May 29, 2010, Ottavino made his major league debut for the Cardinals as a starter. He appeared in five games for the Cardinals in 2010, three of them starts. After the 2010 season, the Cardinals outrighted Ottavino off of their 40-man roster. He pitched for Memphis in 2011, and the Cardinals re-added him to their 40-man roster after the season.

Colorado Rockies

On April 3, 2012, the Colorado Rockies claimed Ottavino off of waivers. The Rockies assigned him to the Colorado Springs Sky Sox of the PCL. They promoted him to the majors later that season, and developed him into a relief pitcher.

In 2013, Ottavino switched his uniform number to 0. Despite posting a 5–1 win–loss record, his earned run average (ERA) was close to 5.00 in 79 innings. In 2013, Ottavino appeared in 51 games, pitching in 78.1 innings and lowering his ERA from the previous season by two runs, registering an ERA of 2.64 for the Rockies. In 2014, Ottavino went 1–4 with a 3.60 ERA in a career high 75 games.

After closer LaTroy Hawkins struggled to open the 2015 season, Ottavino was named the new closer. On May 4, 2015, it was revealed that Ottavino had a partially torn ulnar collateral ligament in his right elbow, which required Tommy John surgery, ending his 2015 season.

After the 2015 season, the Rockies and Ottavino agreed on a three-year contract worth $10.4 million. Ottavino began the 2016 season on the disabled list. After returning, he completed 37 scoreless appearances, in 31 innings pitched, which set a Rockies' franchise record. In 2018, he was 6–4 with a 2.34 ERA, and shared the major league lead in holds, with 34.

Following the 2017 season, Ottavino rented a vacant storefront on St. Nicholas Avenue in Harlem from his father-in-law which he converted into a pitching lab. In the lab, he and other local players at lower levels of the sport used technology and data to develop pitches and hone their craft.

New York Yankees

On January 24, 2019, the New York Yankees signed Ottavino to a three-year contract worth $27 million. Ottavino became the first Yankee in team history to wear uniform number 0, the last single-digit number not retired by the Yankees. During the 2019 season, Ottavino appeared in 73 games for the Yankees, all in relief, pitching to a 6–5 record with 1.90 ERA and 88 strikeouts in  innings pitched. During the shortened 2020 season, he made 24 appearances, all in relief, with a 5.89 ERA and 2–3 record with 25 strikeouts in  innings pitched.

Boston Red Sox
On January 25, 2021, the Yankees traded Ottavino and minor league pitcher Frank German to the Boston Red Sox for cash considerations or a player to be named later; it was only the second trade between the rivals since 1987. During the regular season, Ottavino made 69 appearances for Boston, all in relief, compiling a 7–3 record with 11 saves and 4.21 ERA; he struck out 71 batters in 62 innings. In the postseason, he made five relief appearances, allowing one run in four innings, as the Red Sox advanced to the American League Championship Series. On November 3, Ottavino elected to become a free agent.

New York Mets
On March 14, 2022, Ottavino signed a one-year contract with the New York Mets. During the regular season, Ottavino made 66 appearances for the Mets, all in relief, compiling a 6–3 record with 3 saves and a vastly improved 2.06 ERA; he struck out 79 batters in 65.2 innings. In his lone postseason appearance, he allowed one run in one inning pitched during Game 2 of the National League Wild Card Series against the San Diego Padres. The Mets lost the series the next night.

After the 2022 season, Ottavino re-signed a two-year contract with the Mets worth $14.5 million.

Personal life
During his first season with the Yankees, Ottavino resided in his childhood neighborhood of Park Slope in Brooklyn, New York City, with his wife, Brette, and their two daughters. They currently live in Dyker Heights, Brooklyn.

References

External links

1985 births
Living people
American people of Italian descent
American people of Irish descent
American Roman Catholics
Baseball players from New York (state)
Boston Red Sox players
Colorado Rockies players
Colorado Springs Sky Sox players
Harwich Mariners players
Major League Baseball pitchers
Memphis Redbirds players
New York Mets players
New York Yankees players
Northeastern Huskies baseball players
Palm Beach Cardinals players
People from Park Slope
Peoria Saguaros players
St. Louis Cardinals players
State College Spikes players
Sportspeople from Brooklyn
Baseball players from New York City
Springfield Cardinals players
Swing of the Quad Cities players
People from Dyker Heights, Brooklyn
2009 World Baseball Classic players
2023 World Baseball Classic players